The 2010 Louisiana–Monroe Warhawks football team represented the University of Louisiana at Monroe in the 2010 NCAA Division I FBS football season. The Warhawks, members of the Sun Belt Conference, were led by first-year head coach Todd Berry and played their home games at Malone Stadium. They finished the season 5–7, 4–4 in Sun Belt play.

Schedule

Game summaries

vs. No. 15 Arkansas

References

Louisiana-Monroe
Louisiana–Monroe Warhawks football seasons
Louisiana-Monroe Warhawks football